Pseudocrenilabrus is a genus of fish in the family Cichlidae, commonly known as the mouthbrooders endemic to rivers and lakes in Central and Eastern Africa.

Species
There are currently 4 recognized species in this genus:

 Pseudocrenilabrus multicolor (C. H. Schöller, 1903) (Egyptian mouth-brooder)
 Pseudocrenilabrus nicholsi (Pellegrin, 1928)
 Pseudocrenilabrus philander (M. C. W. Weber, 1897) (Southern mouth-brooder)
 Pseudocrenilabrus pyrrhocaudalis Katongo, Seehausen & Snoeks, 2017 (Fire-tailed pseudocrenilabrus )

References

 
Cichlid genera
Cichlid fish of Africa
Freshwater fish genera
Taxa named by Henry Weed Fowler